Puccinellia tenella is a species of grass in the family Poaceae.

Its native range is Subarctic to Northeastern USA.

Synonyms:
 Puccinellia svalbardensis

References

tenella